Xenotropic and polytropic retrovirus receptor 1 is a protein that in humans is encoded by the XPR1 gene.

References

Further reading